Kevin Geudens (born 2 December 1980 in Geel, Belgium) is Belgian football midfielder. He currently plays for Beerschot Wilrijk in the Belgian Third Division.

External links
 Guardian Football
 
 

1980 births
Living people
Belgian footballers
K.F.C. Dessel Sport players
K.V. Mechelen players
K.V.C. Westerlo players
Belgian Pro League players
K Beerschot VA players
Association football midfielders
People from Geel
Footballers from Antwerp Province